Baron Guillaume Dupuytren (5 October 1777 – 8 February 1835) was a French anatomist and military surgeon. Although he gained much esteem for treating Napoleon Bonaparte's hemorrhoids, he is best known today for his description of Dupuytren's contracture which is named after him and on which he first operated in 1831 and published in The Lancet, in 1834.

Birth and education
Guillaume Dupuytren was born in the town of Pierre-Buffière in the present-day department of Haute-Vienne.

He studied medicine in Paris at the newly established École de Médecine and was appointed prosector, by competition, when only eighteen years of age. His early studies were directed chiefly to anatomical pathology. In 1803 he was appointed assistant surgeon at the Hôtel-Dieu, Paris, and in 1811 he became professor of operative surgery in succession to Raphael Bienvenu Sabatier. In 1816 he was appointed to the chair of clinical surgery and became head surgeon at the Hôtel-Dieu, a post he held until his death. He is buried in the Père Lachaise Cemetery.

Practice
Dupuytren visited the Hôtel-Dieu morning and evening, performing at each time several operations, lectured to vast throngs of students, gave advice to his outpatients, and fulfilled the duties consequent upon one of the largest practices of modern times. By his indefatigable activity he amassed a fortune, the bulk of which he bequeathed to his daughter, with the deduction of considerable sums for the endowment of the anatomical chair in the École de Médecine, and the establishment of a benevolent institution for distressed physicians. The most important of Dupuytren's writings is his Treatise on Artificial Anus, in which he applied the principles laid down by John Hunter. In his operations he was remarkable for his skill and dexterity, and for his great readiness of resource.

Dupuytren was one of the first surgeons to successfully drain a brain abscess using trepanation, in which a hole is cut in the skull, and he also used the method to treat seizures.

He claimed credit for originally describing melanoma and claimed Laennec stole the idea from his lectures.

He reported a case of breast cancer spontaneous remission in which, after the patient refused surgery, the tumor becoming enlarged, rupturing and getting infected, it began shrinking and disappeared after a few weeks.

He died in Paris, and there with his bequest established the Musée Dupuytren.

He was a brilliant teacher, an astute diagnostician and a gifted surgeon. On the other hand, he was extremely critical of students and colleagues who failed to live up to his exacting professional standards. This, along with his desire to be the best of the best won him numerous critics, not all of them objective. He was described by such colourful epithets as 'The Brigand of Hôtel-Dieu' by Jacques Lisfranc and 'First among surgeons, least among men' by Pierre-François Percy.

In fiction
The surgeon Desplein, in Balzac's short story "The Atheist's Mass," is based on Dupuytren. 
Dupuytren's success at draining a cerebral abscess is referred to in Gustave Flaubert's Madame Bovary: "not Dupuytren, about to open up an abscess through a thick encephalic layer" (Part Two, Chapter 11).
Reference is made in Victor Hugo's Les Misérables: "Dupuytren and Recamier entered into a quarrel in the amphitheatre of the School of Medicine, and threatened each other with their fists on the subject of the divinity of Jesus Christ."
 In Diana Gabaldon's fifth book of the Outlander series, The Fiery Cross, pages 1227-1229, Claire balances her future knowledge with current medical notes since the Baron Dupuytren has yet to be born.
 Stephen Maturin of the Aubrey–Maturin series received some of his medical training in Paris, conceding to have "dissected with Dupuytren" while there.

References

Sources

External links

Catholic Encyclopedia article
 Baron Guillaume Dupuytren. WhoNamedIt.
 Baron Guillaume Dupuytren History of Surgeons – surgeons.org.uk
 On the injuries and diseases of bones by Guillaume Dupuytren (1847)
 Lesions of the Vascular System, Diseases of the Rectum, and other surgical complaints by Guillaume Dupuytren (1854)

1777 births
1835 deaths
People from Haute-Vienne
French surgeons
French anatomists
19th-century French physicians
18th-century French physicians
French pathologists
French military doctors
Members of the French Academy of Sciences
Burials at Père Lachaise Cemetery